Charles Nelson Herreid (October 20, 1857 – July 6, 1928) was the fourth Governor of South Dakota.

Biography
Charles Herreid was born in Dane County, Wisconsin. His parents, Nels Olson Herreid (1832–1902) and Thone Kittelson Herreid (1833–1908), were both Norwegian immigrants. He attended Galesville University in Wisconsin from 1874 to 1878 and the University of Wisconsin from 1880 to 1882. He married Jeannette E. Slye in 1881 and he moved to McPherson County, South Dakota in 1883.  There he served as a McPherson County court judge from 1888 to 1891.

Career
Herreid was elected Lieutenant Governor of the new State of South Dakota from 1892 to 1896. He chaired the Republican State Central Committee from 1898 until 1900, when he was elected governor.  Herreid, a Republican from Eureka, South Dakota, served from 1901 to 1905. He had previously served as the third Lieutenant Governor of South Dakota from 1893 to 1897 under Governor Charles H. Sheldon.

During Herreid's first gubernatorial term, efforts were made to reform the state's penal code, and a reduction in railroad rates helped ease the plight of farmers. Herreid worked for growth in state schools, Indian care and the development of good roads during his term as governor. During his second term, big business interests were brought under control, as was the power of political machines.

Herreid declined to run for a third term, returning to his law practice in Aberdeen, South Dakota. In addition to his political activism and engagement in the practice of law, during his lifetime, Herreid was director of the Western Mutual Life Insurance Company, president of Citizens Trust and Savings Bank, Federal Food Administrator for South Dakota, chairman of the South Dakota Military Training Camps Association, trustee of the University of Wisconsin, and a member of the Board of Regents for Education for South Dakota. He also served as a member of the South Dakota committee of the Red Cross.

Death
Herreid died in Aberdeen, South Dakota following an attack of ptomaine poisoning. and was interred at Riverside Memorial Park Cemetery, Aberdeen, Brown County, South Dakota.

References

External links
National Governors Association

1857 births
1928 deaths
People from Eureka, South Dakota
Politicians from Aberdeen, South Dakota
Politicians from Madison, Wisconsin
South Dakota state court judges
Republican Party governors of South Dakota
Lieutenant Governors of South Dakota
Gale College alumni
University of Wisconsin–Madison alumni
American people of Norwegian descent